Willow Bunch is a former provincial electoral division  for the Legislative Assembly of the province of Saskatchewan, Canada, centred on the rural municipality of Willow Bunch. This district was created before the 3rd Saskatchewan general election in 1912. The constituency was dissolved and combined with the Notukeu district (as Notukeu-Willow Bunch) before the 9th Saskatchewan general election in 1938.

It is now part of the Wood River constituency.

A federal electoral district in the same area called "Willow Bunch" existed from 1924 until 1935.

Members of the Legislative Assembly

Election results 

|-
 
|style="width: 130px"|Conservative
|William W. Davidson
|align="right"|825
|align="right"|50.46%
|align="right"|–

|- bgcolor="white"
!align="left" colspan=3|Total
!align="right"|1,635
!align="right"|100.00%
!align="right"|

|-

 
|Conservative
|James Lambe
|align="right"|1,340
|align="right"|33.16%
|align="right"|-17.30
|- bgcolor="white"
!align="left" colspan=3|Total
!align="right"|4,041
!align="right"|100.00%
!align="right"|

|-

|- bgcolor="white"
!align="left" colspan=3|Total
!align="right"|5,573
!align="right"|100.00%
!align="right"|

|-

|- bgcolor="white"
!align="left" colspan=3|Total
!align="right"|5,060
!align="right"|100.00%
!align="right"|

|-

|- bgcolor="white"
!align="left" colspan=3|Total
!align="right"|Acclamation
!align="right"|

|-

 
|Conservative
|William James Gibbins
|align="right"|4,316
|align="right"|49.39%
|align="right"|-
|- bgcolor="white"
!align="left" colspan=3|Total
!align="right"|8,739
!align="right"|100.00%
!align="right"|

|-

 
|Conservative
|Edgar B. Linnell
|align="right"|1,445
|align="right"|28.27%
|align="right"|-21.12
 
|Farmer-Labour
|Charles Morley W. Emery
|align="right"|1,219
|align="right"|23.85%
|align="right"|–
|- bgcolor="white"
!align="left" colspan=3|Total
!align="right"|5,112
!align="right"|100.00%
!align="right"|

See also 
Electoral district (Canada)
List of Saskatchewan provincial electoral districts
List of Saskatchewan general elections
List of political parties in Saskatchewan
Willow Bunch, Saskatchewan

References 
 Saskatchewan Archives Board – Saskatchewan Election Results By Electoral Division

Former provincial electoral districts of Saskatchewan